Deh Deraz or Deh-e Deraz may refer to:
 Deh Deraz, Afghanistan
 Deh-e Deraz, Sistan and Baluchestan, Iran